Degré is a commune in France. 

Degré or degre may also refer to:

 Alajos Degré (1819–1896), Hungarian lawyer and writer 
 Tippi Degré (born 1990), French writer